Willis Davis was a state legislator in Mississippi. He served in the Mississippi House of Representatives from 1874 to 1876 from Adams County, Mississippi. He represented Adams County, Mississippi. He was born in Mississippi.l

See also
African-American officeholders during and following the Reconstruction era

References

Year of birth missing
Year of death missing
African-American state legislators in Mississippi